Wei Biao Wu is a Chinese-born statistician.  He is a professor of statistics at the University of Chicago.

Education and career
Wu attended Fudan University, receiving his bachelor's degree in 1997.  He went on to the University of Michigan for graduate studies, receiving his PhD in 2001 under the supervision of Michael Woodroofe and Sándor Csörgő.  He was hired at the University of Chicago shortly after completing his PhD, and has remained there since.

Wu is best-known for his work on dependence, in which the main new idea is to interpret random processes as physical systems, and to examine coefficients that would have physical meaning.  According to Google Scholar, this work has been cited over 350 times.  Wu has written over 100 papers.

Wu has more than 20 students and their descendants working in academia.

Most-cited publications 
 His most cited article, WB Wu, Nonlinear system theory: Another look at dependence in Proceedings of the National Academy of Sciences (2005) 2005 Oct 4;102(40):14150-4.  (open access) has been cited 485 times, according to Google Scholar.
Wu WB, Pourahmadi M. Nonparametric estimation of large covariance matrices of longitudinal data. Biometrika. 2003 Dec 1;90(4):831-44.  (open access) has been cited 341 times, according to Google Scholar 
Wu WB. Strong invariance principles for dependent random variables. The Annals of Probability. 2007;35(6):2294-320.  (open access)  has been cited 235  times, according to Google Scholar  
Wu WB, Shao X. Limit theorems for iterated random functions. Journal of Applied Probability. 2004 Jun;41(2):425-36.  has been cited  194 times, according to Google Scholar 
Wu WB, Zhao Z. Inference of trends in time series. Journal of the Royal Statistical Society, Series B (Statistical Methodology). 2007 Jun;69(3):391-410.  (open access) (Cited 172 times, according to Google Scholar.)  
Shao X, Wu WB. Asymptotic spectral theory for nonlinear time series. The Annals of Statistics. 2007 Aug;35(4):1773-801. [](open access) (Cited 199 times, according to Google Scholar.  (open access) )  
 
In all, he has published 38 papers with ≥38 citations each.

Personal life
Wu has practiced Falun Gong since 1998. His religious practices and criticism of the Communist Party of China led to inaction on his 2005 request for renewal of his Chinese passport. Following the loss of his Chinese passport, Wu's Chinese nationality was also revoked.

References

External links
 

University of Michigan alumni
Chinese statisticians
Chinese emigrants to the United States
21st-century American mathematicians
Living people
University of Chicago faculty
American statisticians
Fudan University alumni
21st-century Chinese mathematicians
Falun Gong practitioners
People who lost Chinese citizenship
Year of birth missing (living people)